Kemal Kerinçsiz (born February 20, 1960 in Edirne, Turkey) is a Turkish nationalist lawyer, famous for filing complaints against more than 40 Turkish journalists and authors (including Orhan Pamuk, Elif Şafak, and the late Hrant Dink) for "insulting Turkishness". He heads the Büyük Hukukçular Birliği ("Great Union of Jurists"), which is responsible for most Article 301 trials.

On 5 August 2013 Kerinçsiz was sentenced to aggravated life imprisonment as part of the Ergenekon trials. He was released together with several other suspects in March 2014.

References

1960 births
Living people
People from Edirne
20th-century Turkish lawyers
Turkish nationalists
Mass media freedom in Turkey
People convicted in the Ergenekon trials
Prisoners sentenced to life imprisonment by Turkey
21st-century Turkish lawyers